Adly Yaish is the mayor of the Nablus Municipality (Dec. 2005–present)  in the central highlands of the West Bank under the Palestinian National Authority.

He is a known businessman working in automobiles trade

On 24 May 2007 he was arrested by Israeli forces. He spent 15 months in prison without being charged.

References

Living people
Year of birth missing (living people)
Mayors of Nablus
Hamas members
Palestinian people imprisoned by Israel
Palestinian mechanical engineers